The 1962 NAIA football season was the seventh season of college football sponsored by the NAIA. The season was played from August to December 1962, culminating in the seventh annual NAIA Football National Championship, played this year at Hughes Stadium in Sacramento, California. During its three years in Sacramento, the game was called the Camellia Bowl (separate from the present day bowl game with the same name in Montgomery, Alabama).

Central State defeated  in the championship game, 28–13, to win their first NAIA national title.

Conference standings

Postseason

See also
 1962 NCAA University Division football season
 1962 NCAA College Division football season

References

 
NAIA Football National Championship